was a lieutenant general in the Imperial Japanese Army during World War II, known for his role as  Governor of Hong Kong under Japanese occupation.

Biography
Sakai was born in Kamo District, Hiroshima, now part of Hiroshima city. He was educated in military preparatory schools in Kobe and Osaka and graduated from the 20th class of the Imperial Japanese Army Academy in 1908, whereupon he was assigned to the IJA 28th Infantry Regiment. He graduated from the 28th class of the Army Staff College.

Career in China
In 1928, Sakai was stationed in Jinan, Shandong Province, China with the IJA 12th Infantry Regiment during the Jinan Incident and is believed by some Chinese historians to be responsible for the murder of Kuomintang army emissaries during negotiations on May 4, 1928.  He was transferred to the Tientsin Garrison from 1929 to 1932.  In 1932, Sakai was promoted to colonel and was assigned to the 5th Section military intelligence of the 2nd Bureau of the Imperial Japanese Army General Staff from 1932 to 1934.

As Chief of Staff of the Japanese China Garrison Army from 1934 to 1935, Sakai orchestrated a series of armed conflicts, which resulted in an armistice with the Chinese government which resulted in the He–Umezu Agreement which effectively gave Japan control of Hebei Province. He became commander of the IJA 23rd Infantry Regiment in 1936.  Sakai was promoted to major general in 1937 and was appointed commander of the IJA 28th Infantry Brigade.  He became a lieutenant general in 1939, and was assigned to the Coordination Bureau, Asia Development Group, Mengjiang Board from 1939 to 1940. He was also assigned to the Mongolia Garrison Army at this time.

Recalled to Japan in 1940, Sakai was briefly appointed commander of the Imperial Guards Depot Division.

World War II
Sakai was commander of the IJA 23rd Army stationed in Canton in November 1941. He was ordered to use the IJA 38th Division, which was normally under the Southern Expeditionary Army Group to capture Hong Kong, and was given a 10-day time limit.

On December 8, 1941, a few hours after the attack on Pearl Harbor, Japanese forces commanded by Sakai, and his Chief of Staff Tadamichi Kuribayashi, invaded Hong Kong. However, the subsequent Battle of Hong Kong did not proceed as quickly or as smoothly as Sakai had planned, and he was forced to request an extension to his deadline. Sir Mark Young, the Governor of Hong Kong, surrendered all British forces in Hong Kong on Christmas Day, after 18 days of fighting.  Sakai’s frustrations over the unexpectedly strong British resistance may have been reflected by the extreme brutality which characterized the campaign and subsequent occupation.

Sakai served as Japanese Governor of Hong Kong until February 20, 1942. He was recalled to Japan, and retired from active service in 1943. He was recalled to active service in February 1945, and was ordered to go to Beijing; however, the war came to an end before he departed Japan.

Execution
After the end of the war, Sakai was apprehended by the American occupation authorities at the request of the Chinese government and was extradited to China, where he was accused of war crimes. He was convicted at the Nanjing War Crimes Tribunal on August 27, 1946 of command responsibility for the extrajudicial murder of Chinese civilians and was executed by firing squad on September 30.

References

Footnotes

Sources 

 Books

External links

1887 births
1946 deaths
Imperial Japanese Army generals of World War II
Japanese occupation of Hong Kong
Executed military personnel
People executed by the Republic of China by firing squad
Japanese people executed abroad
Japanese people executed for war crimes
Governors of Hong Kong
Military personnel from Hiroshima Prefecture
20th-century Hong Kong people